Working People's Party may refer to:

Working People's Party of England, an English former political party
Working People's Party (Moldova), a Moldovan political party
Working People's Party (Puerto Rico), a Puerto Rican political party